The Wenceslau Guimarães Ecological Station is an ecological station in the state of Bahia, Brazil.

Location

The Wenceslau Guimarães Ecological Station (ESEC) is in the municipality of Wenceslau Guimarães, Bahia.
The  Caminhos Ecológicos da Boa Esperança Environmental Protection Area, created in 2003, serves as a buffer zone.
The ESEC is in the Rio das Almas sub-basin of the Recôncavo Sul basin.
It has Atlantic Forest vegetation.
Endangered mammals include southern tamandua (Tamandua tetradactyla), sloth, quaiti and the black-tufted marmoset (Callithrix penicillata).
The rare white-necked hawk (Buteogallus lacernulatus) is found in the ESEC.
It is threatened by deforestation, poaching and squatters.

History

The area was redefined in 1977.
The Wenceslau Guimarães Ecological Station was created by state governor decree 6.228 of 21 February 1997.
It was created due to the great biological diversity of the Wenceslau Guimarães Forest Reserve, the endemic and endangered species, the need to protect the sources of the Das Almas River and the fact that the area is part of the core zone of the Atlantic Forest Biosphere Reserve.
The management plan was issued in 1997.
The ESEC became part of the Central Atlantic Forest Ecological Corridor, created in 2002.

Notes

Sources

Ecological stations of Brazil
Protected areas of Bahia
1997 establishments in Brazil
Protected areas established in 1997